Microvirga subterranea  is a Gram-negative, moderate thermophile, rod-shaped and aerobic bacteria with a single polar flagellum from the genus of Microvirga which has been isolated from the Great Artesian Basin in Queensland in Australia.

References

Further reading

External links
Type strain of Microvirga subterranea at BacDive -  the Bacterial Diversity Metadatabase

Hyphomicrobiales
Bacteria described in 2003